Yīng is a Chinese surname. It is not a common surname in China.

In the Zhou Dynasty of China, one prince of the King Wu of Zhou (the first king of the Zhou Dynasty) was enfeoffed the land called Ying, and the offspring of the prince used Ying as their surname, now people with the surname of Ying mainly live in the Zhejiang Province.

Notable people 
Ing Chang-ki, Taiwan industrialist, the founder of the Ing Cup, born in Cixi City, Ningbo, Zhejiang Province in 1917
Ying Chongfu (1918-2011), a Chinese acoustical physicist
Ying Guixin, leader of the politically connected Green Gang in Shanghai and closely associated with the Yuan Shikai government. He was one of the figures responsible in the assassination of politician Song Jiaoren
Ying Meijin, one of the founders of Hengdeli Group in 1922, now one of the major watch retailers in Asia
Ying Yong, provincial politician who has held office in Zhejiang and Shanghai

Ying
Individual Chinese surnames